Etienne Faure (born 1969) is French producer, director and screenwriter, mostly known for his art house movies.

Works 

 1985 : Y’a pas le feu by Richard Balducci : assistant director 
 1988 : À la recherche de Tadzio, Short film documentary and interview with Björn Andrésen : Director, screenwriter, producer
 1991 : Les Paroles invisibles, Short film, fiction : Director, screenwriter
 1992 : Tous les garçons, Short film, fiction : Director, screenwriter
 1997 : La Fin de la nuit, Short film, fiction : Director, screenwriter
 2000 : In extremis, Feature film, fiction : Director, screenwriter, producer
 2004 : Quoi ? L'éternité, documentary to celebrate the 150th anniversary of the birth of Rimbaud: Director, screenwriter, cinematographer, producer
 2004 : Prisoner, Short film, fiction : Director, screenwriter, producer
 2009 : Des illusions, Feature film, fiction : Director, screenwriter, producer
 2012 : Désordres, Feature film, psychological thriller : Director, screenwriter, producer
 2014 : Bizarre, Feature film : Director, screenwriter, producer

External links

References 

French directors
French screenwriters
French film producers
1969 births
Living people
Place of birth missing (living people)